The 2018–19 San Diego State Aztecs women's basketball team represents San Diego State University in the 2018–19 NCAA Division I women's basketball season. The Aztecs, led by sixth year head coach Stacie Terry, play their home games at the Viejas Arena as members of the Mountain West Conference. They finished the season 14–18, 7–11 in Mountain West play to finish in a tie for seventh place. They advanced to the semifinals of the Mountain West women's tournament where they lost to Wyoming.

Roster

Schedule

|-
!colspan=9 style=| Exhibition

|-
!colspan=9 style=| Non-conference regular season

|-
!colspan=9 style=| Mountain West regular season

|-
!colspan=9 style=| Mountain West Women's Tournament

See also
2018–19 San Diego State Aztecs men's basketball team

References

San Diego State
San Diego State Aztecs women's basketball seasons
San Diego State
San Diego State